Salkuyeh (also Romanized as Sālkūyeh; also known as Sālkūyeh ) is a village in Daryasar Rural District, Kumeleh District, Langarud County, Gilan Province, Iran. At the 2006 census, its population was 825, in 249 families.

References 

Populated places in Langarud County